LO Pegasi is a single star in the northern constellation of Pegasus that has been the subject of numerous scientific studies. LO Pegasi, abbreviated LO Peg, is the variable star designation. It is too faint to be viewed with the naked eye, having an apparent visual magnitude that ranges from 9.04 down to 9.27. Based on parallax measurements, LO Peg is located at a distance of 79 light years from the Sun. It is a member of the young AD Doradus group of co-moving stars, and is drifting closer with a radial velocity of −23 km/s.

This is a K-type main-sequence star with a stellar classification of K3Vke, where the 'k' suffix indicates interstellar absorption lines and 'e' means there are emission lines in the spectrum. It became of interest to astronomers when significant X-ray emission was detected from this star in 1994. R. D. Jeffries and associates reported flare activity based on a rotationally-broadened hydrogen α emission line and found the star varied in brightness.

LO Peg is an ultrafast rotator, completing a full rotation every . It is classified as a BY Draconis variable that is magnetically active and has star spots. The combination of non-uniform surface brightness and rotation makes it appear to vary in luminosity. Up to 25.7% of the surface is covered in spots. Long term changes in periodicity suggest activity cycles, similar to the solar cycle, with periods of approximately 3 and 7.4 years. The element lithium has been detected in its atmosphere, whose abundance, in combination with the star's rapid rotation, indicates this is a young star with an age of no more than a few hundred million years.

See also

References

Further reading

K-type main-sequence stars
BY Draconis variables
Emission-line stars

Pegasus (constellation)
Durchmusterung objects
Gliese and GJ objects
106231
Pegasi, LO